Patricia McPherson is a former American actress and activist best known for her role in the 1980s TV series Knight Rider as Bonnie Barstow.

Early life
McPherson was born in Oak Harbor, Washington. She is the daughter of a naval officer. She graduated from San Diego State University with a degree in advertising.

Career
McPherson has made guest appearances in a variety of television shows including Dynasty,  Starman, Murder She Wrote, MacGyver, Matlock, and Star Trek: The Next Generation.
McPherson retired from acting in 1991, although she made a cameo appearance as a Regent in the Syfy television series Warehouse 13 in 2009.  Aside from that, she has stated in recent interviews that she has no plans to return to acting; however, she has appeared at a few Knight Rider events over the years.

Knight Rider
McPherson is best remembered for her role in the 1980s TV series Knight Rider as Bonnie Barstow, KITT's mechanic. She appeared in season one and was absent from season two. She returned in the season three opener and remained until the end of the series in 1986. Knight Rider has appeared in syndication in over 200 countries throughout the world, most notably in Australia, Canada, Germany, and the United Kingdom.

Personal life
McPherson is married to James Garrett.

After McPherson retired from acting in the early 1990s, she decided to pursue conserving wildlife and the forests; her efforts have included helping in attempts to preserve the Ballona Wetlands in southern California and working with the Ballona Wetlands Trust to sue the Playa Vista community for failure to take action concerning methane.

Filmography

 Knight Rider (1982–83, 1984–86) (TV) as Bonnie Barstow (62 episodes)
 MacGyver (1987) (TV) as Michelle 'Mike' Forester (1 episode)
 Star Trek: The Next Generation (1988) (TV) as Ariel (1 episode)
 Dynasty (1988)  (TV) as Victoria Aynders (1 episode)
 Murder, She Wrote "A Body to Die For" (1990) (TV) as Betty (1 episode)
 Matlock "The Witness Killings" (1991) (TV) as Karen Sylvester (2 episodes)
 Warehouse 13 (2009) (TV) as Regent (1 episode)

References

External links

 

Living people
Actresses from Washington (state)
American film actresses
American television actresses
People from Oak Harbor, Washington
American women environmentalists
20th-century American actresses
21st-century American women
Year of birth missing (living people)